The Belgium Ypres Westhoek Rally (BYWR) founded by Frans Thévelin in 1965 is one of the most famous rallies in the European Rally Championship, the Belgian Rally Championship, the British Rally Championship, and the Intercontinental Rally Challenge.

In its history, the rally has had some famous pilots and co-pilots participating, such as Didier Auriol, Colin McRae, Alister McRae, Juha Kankkunen, François Duval, Michèle Mouton, Jean Todt, Armin Schwarz and Ari Vatanen among others. It was hosted for 44 years by A.C. Targa Florio from 1965 till 2008. It is currently hosted by Super Stage under management of Alain Penasse. It was a round of the 2021 World Rally Championship and the 2022 World Rally Championship replacing the cancelled Rally GB.

Winners

References

External links

Rally at ewrc-results.com

 
European Rally Championship rallies
Intercontinental Rally Challenge rallies
World Rally Championship rallies
Recurring sporting events established in 1965